Penugonda is a town in West Godavari district of the Indian state of Andhra Pradesh.

Narasapuram to Nidadavolu main line passes through Penugonda. It is the junction for the people to go to Rajahmundry , Nidadavolu , Palakollu , Tanuku and Bhimavaram.

North Peravali Mandal, South Achanta mandal and Poduru mandal, East Godavari River , West Iragavaram mandal and Penumantra mandal sharing boundaries with Vasavi Penugonda.

Demographics 

 Census of India, Penugonda had a population of 16038. The total population constitute, 7857 males and 8181 females with a sex ratio of 1041 females per 1000 males. 1377 children are in the age group of 0–6 years, with sex ratio of 1046 females per 1000 males. The average literacy rate stands at 82.50%.  Penugonda mandal  population of 69857.

Penugonda mandal 
Penugonda Mandal is one of the mandal in West Godavari district. Under Penugonda there are 14 villages and total it is known as Penugonda Mandal.

Transport 
The Andhra Pradesh State Road Transport Corporation operates bus services from Penugonda bus station.

References

Cities and towns in West Godavari district